Faiz Ahmed (born 21 June 1978) is an Indian former cricketer. He played thirteen first-class matches for Hyderabad between 1999 and 2004.

See also
 List of Hyderabad cricketers

References

External links
 

1978 births
Living people
Indian cricketers
Hyderabad cricketers
Cricketers from Hyderabad, India